Wabash College is a private liberal arts men's college in Crawfordsville, Indiana. Founded in 1832 by several Dartmouth College graduates and Midwestern leaders, it enrolls nearly 900 students. The college offers an undergraduate liberal arts curriculum in three academic divisions with 39 majors.

History
The college was initially named "The Wabash Teachers Seminary and Manual Labor College", a name shortened to its current form by 1851. Many of the founders were Presbyterian ministers, yet nevertheless believed that Wabash should be independent and non-sectarian. Patterning it after the liberal arts colleges of New England, they resolved "that the institution be at first a classical and English high school, rising into a college as soon as the wants of the country demand."

Among these ministers was Caleb Mills, who became Wabash College's first faculty member. Dedicated to education in the then-primitive Mississippi Valley area, he would come to be known as the father of the Indiana public education system.

Elihu W. Baldwin, the first president of the college, served from 1835 until 1840. He came from a church in New York City and accepted the presidency even though he knew that Wabash was at that time threatened with bankruptcy. After his death, he was succeeded by Charles White, a graduate of Dartmouth College and the brother-in-law of Rev. Edmund Otis Hovey (1801–1877), a professor at the college. Joseph F. Tuttle, who became president of Wabash College in 1862 and served for 30 years, worked with his administrators to improve town-gown relations in Crawfordsville. Gronert described him "an eloquent preacher, a sound administrator, and an astute handler of public relations." He is the namesake of Tuttle Grade School in Crawfordsville (1906) and Tuttle Junior High School, now Tuttle Middle School (1960). Dr. Scott E. Feller, Dean of the college from 2014 to 2020 and chemistry professor at Wabash since 1998, became the 17th President of Wabash College on July 1, 2020.

During World War II, Wabash College was one of 131 colleges and universities that offered students a path to a Navy commission as part of the V-12 Navy College Training Program.

In the early 1900s, the college closed its "Preparatory School", which prepared incoming students from less-rigorous rural high schools that lacked the courses required for entrance to the college.

In 1996, Wabash became the first college in America to stage Tony Kushner's Angels in America.

Academics

Curriculum
Wabash College's curriculum is divided into three: Division I, Division II, and Division III representing the natural sciences, humanities and arts, and social sciences respectively. Wabash offers 25 academic programs as majors and 32 accompanying minors. Its most popular majors, by 2021 graduates, were:
Rhetoric and Composition (21)
Economics (20)
History (18)
Religion/Religious Studies (15)
Experimental Psychology (14)
English Language and Literature (11)
Biology/Biological Sciences (10)

Comprehensive exams
Seniors at Wabash College take a three-day comprehensive exam in their major subject area. There are two days of written exams and one day of oral exams. The two days of written exams differ by major, but the oral exams are relatively uniform. A senior meets with three professors, one from his major, another from his minor, and a third professor who represents an outside perspective, and can be from any discipline. Over the course of an hour a senior answers questions from the professors which can relate to anything during his studies at Wabash. A senior must pass the comprehensive examinations in order to be eligible for a degree.

Student life

Student culture and traditions
Tradition begins early at Wabash College and continues throughout one's college career. On "Ringing In Saturday", incoming students are addressed by the dean of students, the dean of admissions, the president of the alumni association, and the college president and are "rung in" by the president, using the same bell that Caleb Mills used to call students to class. On Homecoming weekend, students are given the opportunity to show how well they know the college fight song (Old Wabash) during "Chapel Sing".

Rhyneship was a freshman orientation program that took first-semester freshmen, "rhynes" and acculturated them to Wabash. While some aspects of rhyneship were less visible, the most visible was the wearing of the "rhynie pot", a green hat with a red bill. When approaching a member of the faculty or Senior Council, the freshman would dip his pot as a sign of respect. This tradition is carried on by the pledges of the Phi Delta Theta Fraternity. Rhyneship is continued through the Sphinx Club, a secret society made up of campus leaders, which aims to unite the campus, honor traditions, and create an atmosphere of support and prestige. Sphinx Club members don white "pots" to distinguish themselves on campus.

Student government
The student government, referred to collectively as the Student Body of Wabash College, comprises executive and legislative branches.

Student organizations
Student organizations at Wabash receive funding and recognition from the Student Senate. This funding in turn comes from a student activities fee, which every attendee of the college must pay each semester. The student paper of Wabash College is The Bachelor and has been published since the early 1900s.

Gentleman's rule
Rather than an explicit student code of conduct, Wabash has a single rule:

The college says that this rule is its oldest tradition.

Fraternities
The first fraternity, Beta Theta Pi, appeared at Wabash in 1846 and has been on campus continuously since.  It was quickly followed by Phi Delta Theta and others.  Many of the traditions of the college were begun and are maintained by the fraternities, both individually and collectively. On average, 50–60% of students belong to one of the campus's ten national fraternities. Unlike most other colleges and universities, Wabash fraternity members – including pledges and associate members – live in the fraternity houses by default.  Most Greek students live in their respective houses all four years.  This has led to the odd circumstance of a college with fewer than 1,000 students dotted with Greek houses of a size appropriate to campuses ten times Wabash's size. The fraternity chapters range in size from about 40 to 70 members each.

The college and the fraternity system have created a somewhat symbiotic relationship that differs from most other colleges and universities.  The college believes that the system largely accomplishes the task of quickly involving new students in the life of the college while also providing leadership opportunities for a larger number of students.  All fraternity houses on campus are owned by the college, though often largely built with funds from the fraternity alumni associations.  In 2009, the college and the fraternities' alumni associations completed a 10-year effort to rebuild or renovate the chapter houses.  At the same time, the college realized that fraternity life is not right for each student. The rebuilding project continued by building new dormitories and renovating others.

In 2008, freshman Johnny D. Smith died of alcohol poisoning while pledging at Delta Tau Delta. Wabash College shut down the fraternity and revoked the lease on their house.

Active fraternities
Beta Theta Pi (ΒΘΠ)
Delta Tau Delta (ΔΤΔ)
Kappa Sigma (ΚΣ)
Lambda Chi Alpha (ΛΧΑ)
Phi Delta Theta (ΦΔΘ)
Phi Gamma Delta (ΦΓΔ or FIJI)
Phi Kappa Psi (ΦΚΨ)
Sigma Chi (ΣΧ)
Theta Delta Chi (ΘΔΧ)
Tau Kappa Epsilon (ΤΚΕ)

Co-curricular activities

Wabash Democracy & Public Discourse (WDPD) 
The WDPD initiative advances the kinds of deliberation, discussion, debate, and advocacy that cultivate democracy. Its goals are to teach constructive practices of engagement and communication, stimulate productive public discourse on campus and in the community, develop civic leadership through participation in public life, and promote the free speech rights and responsibilities of every individual. Students in WDPD work with campus and community partners to design and facilitate public engagement events, such as community forums, dialogues, and public deliberations. Students involved with WDPD leave Wabash with advanced, applied skills in oral and written communication, leadership, public affairs, and civic awareness that will enable them to contribute more productively to their communities, their workplaces, and to their personal relationships.

Wabash College Glee Club 
The tradition of singing at Wabash College dates back to its earliest years; the Wabash College Glee Club and Mandolin Society were established in 1892 (as evidenced by a photograph and membership list in that year's Ouiatenon). Not much is known about the early years of the Glee Club; that changed when R. Robert Mitchum joined the faculty as Glee Club Director in 1947. Mitchum led the group until 1969. The Glee Club celebrated its 125th anniversary on September 30, 2017, with a dinner and concert.

Endowment 
As of August 1, 2021, the value of Wabash's endowment was approximately $400 million, which places Wabash among the richest colleges in the nation in per-student endowment.  The endowment was created primarily over the past 70 years using major campaigns and estate planning with alumni. Major donors include the pharmaceutical industrialist Eli Lilly, the company his grandfather founded, his heirs, and the Lilly Endowment.  The school's library is named after him as are a number of premier scholarships including the Lilly Award, the college's most prestigious scholarship established in 1974 to honor the Eli Lilly family and recognize young men of outstanding character, creativity, and academic accomplishment. During the most recent capital campaign, "Challenge of Excellence", between fall 2010 and 1 October 2012, the college raised $68 million, exceeding the original goal of $60 million.

Athletics

The school's sports teams are called the Little Giants.  They participate in the NCAA's Division III and in the North Coast Athletic Conference for all but one of their 12 varsity sports. The only exception is volleyball, the school's newest varsity sport, which was added in advance of the 2021 season (2020–21 school year). Since the NCAC sponsors volleyball only for women, the Little Giants play that sport in the single-sport Midwest Collegiate Volleyball League. Every year since 1911, Wabash College has played rival DePauw University in a football game called the Monon Bell Classic. The rallying cheer of Wabash College athletics is "Wabash always fights".  Wabash College competes in men's intercollegiate baseball, basketball, tennis, cross country, lacrosse, track and field, golf, football, soccer, swimming and diving, volleyball, and wrestling.

The basketball team at Wabash was formerly coached by legendary Malcolm "Mac" Petty, who retired after 35 seasons at Wabash. Wabash won the 1981–82 NCAA Division III title (the school's only national title) with a 24–4 record. Wabash won the first national intercollegiate championship basketball tournament ever held in 1922.

Inter-collegiate football at Wabash dates back to 1884, when student-coach Edwin R. Taber assembled a team and defeated Butler University by a score of 4–0 in the first intercollegiate football game in the history of the state of Indiana.  The current head football coach is Don Morel.

In the summer of 2010, Wabash reconstructed Mud Hollow and Byron P. Hollett Stadium to provide the football, soccer, baseball, and intramural teams with better athletic facilities.

Monon Bell Classic

Voted "Indiana's Best College Sports Rivalry" by viewers of ESPN in 2005, DePauw University and Wabash College play each November – in the last regular season football game of the year for both teams – for the right to keep or reclaim the Monon Bell. The two teams first met in 1890. In 1932, the Monon Railroad donated its approximately 300-pound locomotive bell to be offered as the prize to the winning team each year. The series is as close as a historic rivalry can be: Wabash leads the series 62–54–9. The game routinely sells out (up to 11,000 seats, depending upon the venue and seating arrangement) and has been televised by ABC, ESPN2, and HDNet.  Each year, alumni from both schools gather at more than 50  locations around the United States for telecast parties, and a commemorative DVD (including historic clips known as "Monon Memories") is produced each year. The final score of the 2017 Monon Bell Classic was Wabash 22, DePauw 21. The Wabash Little Giants currently have won eight of the last nine contests.

In 1999, GQ listed the Monon Bell game as reason number three on its "50 Reasons Why College Football is Better Than Pro Football" list.

National rankings
In 2020 Wabash was ranked joint 54th best national liberal arts college in the annual U.S. News & World Report. Wabash College is also listed in Loren Pope's Colleges That Change Lives.

Notable people

See also
 Modular Neutron Array
 1922 National Intercollegiate Basketball Tournament

References

 Gronert, Theodore G. (1958). Sugar Creek Saga: A History and Development of Montgomery County. Wabash College.
 Harvey, Robert S., ed. (1982). These Fleeting Years: Wabash College 1832–1982. Crawfordsville: R.R. Donnelley & Sons Co.

External links

 
1832 establishments in Indiana
Buildings and structures in Montgomery County, Indiana
Education in Montgomery County, Indiana
Educational institutions established in 1832
Liberal arts colleges in Indiana
Men's universities and colleges in the United States
American manual labor schools
Private universities and colleges in Indiana
Crawfordsville, Indiana